The Olympus E-300 (Olympus Evolt E-300 in North America) is an 8-megapixel digital SLR manufactured by Olympus of Japan and based on the Four Thirds System. Announced at photokina 2004, it became available at the end of 2004. It was the second camera (after the Olympus E-1) to use the Four Thirds System, and the first intended for the consumer market.

Features
The camera's appearance was unique, as it lacked the ubiquitous SLR pentaprism "hump". Instead, a Porro prism system was used; it fitted sideways within the camera, with a sideways-swinging mirror, and located the viewfinder eyepiece to the left (seen from behind) relative to the lens centerline. The body was largely of ABS plastic over a metal frame; the lens mount was metal, and there was a metal covered area on the left top of the camera. This area also contained the onboard flash, which popped up and forward at the touch of a button. The onboard flash popup mechanism is manual. In low light scenarios the flash will not pop up automatically but the photographer must press the button and pop it up before taking the photo.

The E-300 uses Olympus' patented Supersonic Wave Filter dust reduction system to shake dust from the sensor during startup and when requested by the user; this largely eliminates the problem of dust accumulation on the surface of the image sensor.

The E-300 was replaced by the Olympus E-330, a similar model with live preview, in January 2006.

See also 
 Commons:category:Olympus E-300  — Pictures

External links

Official sites
 Olympus America's E-300 pages

Product reviews
 DPReview's E-300 specification page
 Megapixel.net's review of the Olympus E-300

E-300
Four Thirds System
Cameras introduced in 2004